The Jamaica national baseball team is the national baseball team of Jamaica. The team represents Jamaica in international competitions.

References

National baseball teams
Baseball
Baseball in the Caribbean